German submarine U-3037 was a Type XXI U-boat of Nazi Germany's Kriegsmarine during World War II. The Elektroboote submarine was laid down on 18 November 1944 at the AG Weser yard at Bremen, launched on 31 January 1945, and commissioned on 3 March 1945 under the command of Korvettenkapitän Carl Emmermann.

U-3037 was a brand new, high technology electric boat which could run constantly submerged rather than having to surface to recharge her batteries every day the way submarines until that point had had to do. However, these advanced vessels were introduced to the Kriegsmarine only late in 1944, much too late to influence the Battle of the Atlantic, and too late for many of them to serve in an offensive capacity at all.

With the end of the war near, training on U-boats had dropped to a minimum due to lack of fuel, falling morale and the effectiveness of allied attacks on U-boat construction and preparation. The exception to this were the new Type XXI boats, which continued to train in the Baltic Sea.

Design
Like all Type XXI U-boats, U-3037 had a displacement of  when at the surface and  while submerged. The submarine was powered by two MAN SE supercharged six-cylinder M6V40/46KBB diesel engines each providing , two Siemens-Schuckert GU365/30 double-acting electric motors each providing , and two Siemens-Schuckert silent running GV232/28 electric motors each providing .

U-3037 was fitted with six  torpedo tubes in the bow and four  C/30 anti-aircraft guns. She could carry twenty-three torpedoes or seventeen torpedoes and twelve mines. The complement was five officers and fifty-two men.

Fate
U-3037 was scuttled by her crew on 3 May 1945 at Travemünde, Germany.

References

Bibliography

External links
 

World War II submarines of Germany
Type XXI submarines
World War II shipwrecks in the Baltic Sea
U-boats commissioned in 1945
1945 ships
Ships built in Bremen (state)
Operation Regenbogen (U-boat)
Maritime incidents in May 1945